Communist Workers Bloc of Andalusia (in Spanish: Bloque Obrero Comunista de Andalucía) is a political formation in the municipality of Jódar, Jaén province, Spain. BOCA emerged from a split from the Communist Party of the Andalusian People (PCPA).

BOCA was registered as a political party on February 25, 1998. BOCA has participated in the 1999 and 2003 municipal elections in Jodar. In 1999 it got 435 votes (6.46%) and one seat in the municipal council. In 2003 it got 495 votes (7.08%) and one seat. At times BOCA have supported the municipal government of the United Left (IU). In January 2004 a break between BOCA and IU occurred, after which IU had to seek support from the Popular Party (PP).

Cristóbal Jiménez is the spokesperson of BOCA.

Political parties established in 1998
Communist parties in Spain
Political parties in Andalusia
1998 establishments in Spain